Sultan Yussuff Izzuddin Shah Ibni Almarhum Sultan Abdul Jalil Karamatullah Nasiruddin Mukhataram Shah Radziallah Hu'an-hu, KCMG (15 January 1890 - 4 January 1963) was the 32nd Sultan of Perak, a state in the then Federation of Malaya.

Early life and education
Raja Yussuff was born on 15 January 1890 at Bukit Chandan, Kuala Kangsar, Perak. He was the eldest son of Sultan Abdul Jalil Karamatullah Nasiruddin Mukhataram Shah Ibni Almarhum Sultan Idris Mushidul Azzam Shah Rahmatullah. Raja Yussuff was educated at Hogan School (later changed to Clifford School), Kuala Kangsar. He was appointed Raja Di Hilir in 1919 and later in 1921, became Raja Bendahara.

Sultan of Perak
In 1938, upon the death of his uncle, Sultan Iskandar Shah Ibni Almarhum Sultan Idris Murshidul Azzam Shah Rahmatullah, he was appointed as Raja Muda. Raja Yusuf ascended the Perak throne in 1948 following the death of his cousin Sultan Abdul Aziz al-Mu’tasim Billah Shah Ibni Almarhum Raja Muda Musa.

Death

He died at Istana Iskandariah at 4:12 pm on 4 January 1963, ten weeks after the stroke which partially paralysed him and came 11 days before his birthday. He was 72. Almarhum was interred at the Al-Ghufran Royal Mausoleum on Bukit Chandan and was given the posthumous title of Marhum Ghafarullah. He was succeeded by his cousin Sultan Idris Iskandar Al-Mutawakkil Alallahi Shah Ibni Almarhum Sultan Iskandar Shah Kaddasullah.

Legacy
Sekolah Izzuddin Shah, Ipoh is the first islamic boy boarding school in Malaysia and sponsored by Perak State Government before has been taken over by KPM. Has been founded by the first Menteri Besar of Perak. Among the famous islamic school in Perak even in Malaysia.

SMK Sultan Yussuf in Batu Gajah and Sultan Yusuf Bridge in Batak Rabit is named in his honor.

Honours

Honours of Perak
 Founding Grand Master of the Royal Family Order of Perak (12 December 1957 - 4 January 1963)
 Founding Grand Master of the Order of the Perak State Crown (12 December 1957 - 4 January 1963)

Honour of Malaya 
  : 
 Recipient of the Order of the Crown of the Realm (DMN) (31 August 1958)

Foreign Honours
 :
 Honorary Knight Commander of the Order of St Michael and St George (KCMG) – Sir

References

External links

1890 births
1963 deaths
Yussuff Izzuddin Shah
People from Kuala Kangsar
Malaysian Muslims
Malaysian people of Malay descent
Honorary Knights Commander of the Order of St Michael and St George
Yussuff Izzuddin Shah
Recipients of the Order of the Crown of the Realm